Warner Bros. Discovery Sports (WBD Sports) (formerly Turner Sports) is the division of Warner Bros. Discovery (WBD) that is responsible for sports broadcasts on its parent company's various channels in the United States, including TBS, TNT, AT&T SportsNet, and TruTV. It also operates the online digital media outlets for the NCAA, NBA, PGA Tour, and PGA of America. WBD Sports also operates the sports news website Bleacher Report, and its streaming service, B/R Live, as well as NBA TV on behalf of the NBA. It also owns a minority share in the MLB Network. Internationally, another Warner Bros. Discovery Sports-branded division operates Eurosport in Europe.

Turner also owned WPCH-TV, the former WTBS, which was the longtime television home for Major League Baseball's Atlanta Braves. This relationship ended after the 2013 season. WPCH-TV was itself sold to Meredith Corporation in 2017 (which operated the station under a local marketing agreement since 2011 with CBS affiliate WGCL-TV), then to Gray Television in 2021.

Following AT&T's acquisition of Time Warner in 2018, it was announced in March 2019 that the Turner Broadcasting System would be dissolved, and its assets dispersed into Warner Bros. and two new units. Turner Sports was combined with CNN and AT&T SportsNet into a new division known as WarnerMedia News & Sports, led by CNN president Jeff Zucker. In October 2020, Turner Sports announced a partnership with DraftKings to be the exclusive provider of daily fantasy and sports betting information for most Turner Sports and Bleacher Report properties, excluding the NBA due to its league-wide deal with competitor FanDuel.

In 2022, Warner Bros. Discovery was formed with the spin-off of WarnerMedia by AT&T, and its merger with Discovery, Inc. Turner Sports was then renamed as Warner Bros. Discovery Sports, with the brand also being used for the division that manages Discovery's existing European and international sports assets such as Eurosport, Golf Digest, BT Sport, and Global Cycling Network.

History 
The division began in the 1970s as the sports division of Turner Broadcasting System's basic cable networks, with separate TBS Sports and TNT Sports brands for TBS and TNT, respectively. In 1995, a unified Turner Sports rebranding began to be used, accompanied by an intro and outro sequence featuring the voice of CNN Headline News anchor Don Harrison and music from Edd Kalehoff. In 1996, Turner Sports became a division of Time Warner after it merged with Turner Broadcasting System. 

In August 2012, Turner Sports acquired the sports news website Bleacher Report for $175 million.

In 2018, Turner Sports launched a subscription streaming service as a branch of Bleacher Report, known as B/R Live; it would be anchored by Turner's recently-acquired rights to the UEFA Champions League, while also featuring content from the NCAA, NBA League Pass, and others.

Following AT&T's acquisition of Time Warner in 2018, it was announced in March 2019 that the Turner Broadcasting System would be dissolved, and its assets dispersed into Warner Bros. and two new units. Turner Sports was combined with CNN and the AT&T SportsNet regional sports networks into a new division known as WarnerMedia News & Sports, led by CNN president Jeff Zucker. 

In October 2020, Turner Sports announced a partnership with DraftKings to be the exclusive provider of daily fantasy and sports betting information for most Turner Sports and Bleacher Report properties, excluding the NBA due to its league-wide deal with competitor FanDuel.

Current properties 
 NBA on TNT (1989–present)
 Exclusive national regular season Tuesday  (1989–2019 (second half after the All-Star break), 2020–present (full season)) and Thursday night games (1989–2019 (full season), 2020–present (after New Year’s)).
 Martin Luther King Day games (annually)
 Inside the NBA
 NBA Playoffs (1990–present)
 One Conference Finals series (alternating with ESPN and ABC)
 NBA All-Star Weekend (2003–present)
 Rising Stars Challenge
 Slam Dunk Contest
 Three-Point Contest
 Skills Challenge
 All-Star Game (Alternate presentation on TBS)
 Spanish language simulcasts on CNN en Español in the United States.
 MLB on TBS (2007–present)
 Tuesday night games (2022–present) (1 game every week during the regular season but not exclusive nationally)
 MLB Leadoff
 MLB Closer
 Both Division Series match ups in either the AL or NL (alternating with Fox Sports (2007–present)) (select playoff games/overflow on TNT) 
 One League Championship Series (alternating with Fox Sports (2007–present))
 NHL on TNT (2021–present)
 Up to 72 exclusive national games per-season (Wednesdays and some Sundays in the second half of the season)
 Stanley Cup Finals (odd-numbered years)
 Stanley Cup Playoffs (games also on TBS)
 One Conference Finals series (alternating with ESPN/ABC)
 NHL Face-Off
 Winter Classic (annually)
 Thanksgiving Showdown (even-numbered years)
 Stadium Series (even-numbered years)
 Heritage Classic (even-numbered years)
 NCAA Men's Division I Basketball Championship (2011–present; in partnership with CBS Sports)
 First Four on truTV (except for 2021 which aired on both truTV and TBS)
 First and second rounds on TNT, TBS, and truTV with CBS
 Sweet Sixteen and Elite Eight split between TBS and CBS
 Final Four in 2014 and 2015 on TBS
 Final Four and National Championship in even-numbered years from 2016 until 2032 (except 2020 due to COVID-19 pandemic) (airs on TBS)
 ELeague (Turner Sports/WME-IMG Partnership, since 2016)
 All Elite Wrestling
 AEW Dynamite (2019–present) (aired on TNT, 2019–2021) (airs on TBS, 2022–present)
 AEW Rampage (2021–present) (airs on TNT)
 AEW Battle of the Belts (2022–present) (airs on TNT)
 Ring Of Honor
 Ring of Honor PPVs (2022–present) (airs on Bleacher Report)
 Golf
 The Match (2018–present) (airs on TNT)
 U.S. Soccer (2023–present)
 United States men's and women's national team home matches (such as friendlies and FIFA World Cup qualification home matches).
 U.S. Open Cup
 SheBelieves Cup
 All matches to stream on HBO Max, with TNT broadcasting select matches.

Other television properties 
 NBA TV (managed on behalf of the NBA)
 AT&T Sports Networks, LLC
 AT&T SportsNet Pittsburgh
 AT&T SportsNet Rocky Mountain
 AT&T SportsNet Southwest
 Root Sports Northwest (40% with Baseball Club of Seattle, LP)
 MLB Network (16.67% with Major League Baseball, Comcast, Charter Communications and Cox Communications)
 Motor Trend Group
 Motor Trend
 Hot Rod (magazine)
 Four Wheeler (magazine)
 Motor Trend (magazine)

Warner Bros. Discovery Sports Interactive 
 NCAA.com
 Starting with the 2010–11 academic year and continuing through 2031–32, Turner has digital rights to all NCAA championships across all divisions in all sports except football. Under the deal, Turner also manages NCAA.com.
 NBA.com
 PGA.com 
 Bleacher Report
 In February 2019, Turner announced a deal with casino operator Caesars Entertainment Corporation to open a Bleacher Report studio in the sportsbook at Caesars Palace to produce sports betting programming and gaming-related editorial content. The new studio is expected to begin distributing this content by early summer 2019.
 House of Highlights (NBA coverage only)
 B/R Hoops (March Madness coverage only)
 B/R Walk-Off (MLB coverage only)
 B/R Open Ice (NHL coverage only)

Warner Bros. Discovery Sports Europe properties 
 Golf Digest (magazine)
 Eurosport
 Eurosport 1
 Eurosport 2
 Eurosport 2 Xtra (Germany)
 BT Sport (50% with BT Group)
 BT Sport 1
 BT Sport 2
 BT Sport 3
 BT Sport 4
 Global Cycling Network
 GCN+

Former properties 
 GolfTV
 NASCAR.com (2001–2013) 
 NASCAR.COM, and the organization's other digital and social media platforms, were managed by Turner Sports from 2001 to 2013.
 PGATOUR.COM (2006–2012)
 Turner Sports New Media partnered with the PGA Tour to operate PGATOUR.com, the official site of the tpur.
 UEFA (2018–19 until most matches at the round of 16 in 2019–20, originally until 2020–21)
 UEFA Super Cup (2018 and 2019 only)
 UEFA Youth League

Turner South 
 Atlanta Braves baseball
 Atlanta Hawks basketball
 Atlanta Thrashers hockey

CNN/SI 
 National Lacrosse League
 Women's United Soccer Association

TBS 
 Atlanta Hawks basketball
 Atlanta Flames NHL hockey
 Atlanta Chiefs NASL soccer
 Clash of the Champions (1988-1997)
 College Basketball on TBS (1982–1986)
 College Football on TBS (1982–2006)
 Goodwill Games (1986, 1990, 1994, 1998, 2000, 2001)
 Braves TBS Baseball (1973–2007)
 Gator Bowl (1993–1994)
 NASCAR on TBS (1983–2000)
 NBA on TBS (1984-2002, Still used as an overflow feed for the NBA on TNT)
 NCAA Beach Volleyball Championship (2016 & 2017)
 Southeastern Conference sports
 U.S. Olympic Gold (1989–1992)
World Championship Wrestling
 WCW All Nighter (1994-1995)
 WCW Main Event (1988-1998)
 WCW Power Hour (1989-1994)
 WCW Pro (1994-1998)
 WCW Thunder (1998–2001)
 WCW Saturday Night (1972–2001)

TNT 
 NFL on TNT (1990–1997)
 Olympics on TNT (1992, 1994, 1998) (co-produced with CBS)
 Tennis on TNT (2000–2002)
 FIFA World Cup (1990)
 Women's United Soccer Association
 NASCAR on TNT (2001–2014) (co-produced with NBC from 2001 to 2006)
 WCW Monday Nitro (1995–2001)
 Alliance of American Football (2019) (co-produced with CBS/CBS Sports Network/NFL Network)
 Golf on TNT
 PGA Championship (through 2019)
 First and second rounds, early coverage of third and fourth.
 Title Night (1998–2000) (co-produced with CBS)
 UEFA Europa League
 Final
 UEFA Champions League
 46 matches

truTV 
 MetroPCS Friday Night Knockout (2015) (co-produced with HBO)

B/R Live 
 Belgian First Division A
 Polish Cup
 Scottish Professional Football League
 Scottish League Cup
 Scottish Challenge Cup
 Swedish Cup
 Swiss Cup
 UEFA Europa League
 All matches on B/R Live for subscribers or pay-per-match.
 Select qualification stage matches on B/R Live
 UEFA Champions League
 All matches on B/R Live for subscribers or pay-per-match.
 Select qualification stage matches on B/R Live

First-run syndication 
 WCW WorldWide (1975-2001)

Prime Sports 
 WCW Prime (1995-1996)

Notable WBD Sports personalities (past and present) 
 denotes deceased.

 Kate Abdo
 Kenny Albert
 Marv Albert
 David Aldridge
 Adam Alexander
 Brian Anderson
 Debbie Antonelli
 Colby Armstrong
 Stephane Auger
 Ian Baker-Finch
 Charles Barkley
 Rick Barry
 Brent Barry
 Allen Bestwick
 Eric Bischoff
 Paul Bissonnette
 Carter Blackburn
 Dan Bonner
 Jennifer Botterill
 Thom Brennaman
 Bob Brenly
 Hubie Brown
 Brendan Burke
 Lisa Byington
 Chip Caray
 Skip Caray
 Anson Carter
 Andrew Catalon
 Vince Cellini
 Doug Collins
 Bob Costas
 Wally Dallenbach Jr.
 Ron Darling
 Seth Davis
 Spero Dedes
 Ian Eagle
 Dennis Eckersley
 Tarik El-Bashir
 Darren Eliot
 Excalibur
 Marc Fein
 John Forslund
 Mike Fratello
 Rick Fox
 Butch Goring
 Dave Goucher
 Kevin Garnett
 Jean-Luc Grand-Pierre
 Curtis Granderson 
 Draymond Green
 Wayne Gretzky
 Greg Gumbel
 Pat Haden
 Randy Hahn
 Kevin Harlan
 Brendan Haywood
 Taryn Hatcher
 Bret Hedican
 Bobby Heenan
 Grant Hill
 Shane Hnidy
 Shannon Hogan
 Scott Hudson
 Jim Jackson (NBA)
 Jim Jackson (NHL)
 Dana Jacobson
 Avery Johnson
 Ernie Johnson, Jr.
 Ernie Johnson, Sr.
 Gus Johnson
 Magic Johnson
 Lewis Johnson
 Keith Jones
 Mike Joy
 Rick Kamla
 Nabil Karim
 Clark Kellogg
 Steve Kerr
 Don Koharski
 Allie LaForce
 Steve Lavin
 Adam Lefkoe
 Verne Lundquist
 Henrik Lundqvist
 Kristen Ledlow
 Alyson Lozoff
 Buck Martinez
 Jamal Mayers
 Tom McCarthy
 Liam McHugh
 Mike McKenna
 Steve McMichael
 Larry McReynolds
 Meaghan Mikkelson
 Cheryl Miller
 Reggie Miller
 Pedro Martínez
 Chris Myers
 Jim Nantz
 Steve Nash
 Bob Neal
 Shaquille O'Neal
 Brad Nessler
 Gene Okerlund
 Eddie Olczyk
 Rosalyn Gold-Onwude
 Renee Paquette
 Darren Pang
 Candace Parker
 Benny Parsons
 Phil Parsons
 Kyle Petty
 Bill Raftery
 Dave Randorf
 Jackie Redmond
 Drew Remenda
 Amanda Renner
 Ian Riccaboni
 Cal Ripken Jr.
 A.J. Ross
 Jim Ross
 Vince Russo
 Craig Sager
 Bryce Salvador
 Wally Szczerbiak
 Casey Stern
 Gene Steratore 
 Dennis Scott
 Steve Smith
 Tony Schiavone
 Lauren Shehadi
 Ralph Sheheen
 Jody Shelley
 Joe Simpson
 Kenny Smith
 John Smoltz
 Gary Sheffield
 Gordon Solie
 Jim Spanarkel
 Dick Stockton
 Don Sutton
 Julie Stewart-Binks
 Kathryn Tappen
 Taz
 Mike Tenay
 Isiah Thomas
 Reggie Theus
 John Thompson
 Rick Tocchet
 Jeff Van Gundy
 Stan Van Gundy
 Pete van Wieren
 Tom Verducci
 Ashali Vise
 Erika Wachter
 Evan Washburn
 Bill Weber
 Chris Webber 
 Dwyane Wade
 David Wells
 Luke Wileman
 Matt Winer
 Tracy Wolfson
 Keith Yandle
 Matt Yocum
 Larry Zbyszko
 Adam Zucker

See also 
 NCAA#Media 
 Warner Bros. Discovery

References

External links 
 

 
Warner Bros. Discovery subsidiaries
Sports divisions of TV channels
Mass media companies established in 1979
1979 establishments in Georgia (U.S. state)